Yoon Suk-min (Hangul: 윤석민; born September 4, 1985) is a South Korean infielder who plays for the SK Wyverns in the Korea Baseball Organization.

On November 21, 2019, he moved to a 1:1 trade with Huh Do-hwan, then a member of the SK Wyverns.

References

External links 
 Profile and stats on the KBO official site

1985 births
Living people
People from Guri
South Korean baseball players
KBO League infielders
Doosan Bears players
Kiwoom Heroes players
KT Wiz players
SSG Landers players
Sportspeople from Gyeonggi Province